WLVF can refer to:

 WLVF (AM), a radio station (930 AM) licensed to Haines City, Florida, United States
 WLVF-FM, a radio station (90.3 FM) licensed to Haines City, Florida, United States
 Waist-level viewfinder or waist-level finder, a camera feature